Mehdi Pashazadeh (born 27 December 1973) is an Iranian football coach and former player who played as a defender. He played for several clubs, including Esteghlal Tehran, Bayer Leverkusen (Germany), Fortuna Köln (Germany), Rapid Wien (Austria) and Sturm Graz (Austria). He played for the Iran national team and was a participant at the 1998 FIFA World Cup.

Managerial career
In 2012, he was appointed as Parseh Tehran head coach at Azadegan League for a short period of time.

Honours

Player
Esteghlal
Iranian Football League: 1997–98
Hazfi Cup: 2001–02

Manager
Gostaresh Foolad Sahand
Second Division: 2011–12

Shahrdari Tabriz
Second Division: 2013–14

Aluminium Arak
Second Division: 2014–15

Fajr Jam
Second Division: 2015–16

Shahin Bushehr
Second Division: 2017–18

References

External links
 
 Mehdi Pashazadeh in Khabaronline and Azeri Originality

1973 births
Living people
Iranian footballers
Iran international footballers
Iranian football managers
Association football defenders
People from Tehran
Esteghlal F.C. players
1998 FIFA World Cup players
Bayer 04 Leverkusen players
SC Fortuna Köln players
2. Bundesliga players
Expatriate footballers in Germany
SK Rapid Wien players
SK Sturm Graz players
FC Admira Wacker Mödling players
Iranian expatriate footballers
Expatriate footballers in Austria
Austrian Football Bundesliga players
Iranian expatriate sportspeople in Germany
F.C. Nassaji Mazandaran managers
Shahin Bushehr F.C. managers